The Vagina Monologues is performed annually to bring attention to V-Day in thousands of cities and colleges worldwide. The performances generally benefit rape crisis centers and similar resource centers for women.

The Vagina Monologues were also performed in four Muslim countries deemed to be liberal enough to hold the performances. They were Turkey, Egypt, Indonesia and Pakistan.

United States
Actresses who have performed the play include:

Alanis Morissette
Ali Larter
Alice Ripley
Amira Eskander
Amy Irving
Ana Gasteyer
Andrea Martin
Angelica Torn
Annabella Sciorra
Anne E. DeChant
Annie Potts
Audra McDonald
Becky Ann Baker
Brett Butler
Brittany Murphy
Brooke Shields
Calista Flockhart
Calpernia Addams
Carol Kane
Carolee Carmello
Cassie Casiano
Cate Blanchett
Cindy Williams
Claire Danes
Cynthia Garrett
Cynthia Nixon
Diahann Carroll
Diana Alvarez
Diana Bracho
Didi Conn
 Donna Loren
Ella Joyce
Erica Jong
Erin Slimak
Francelle S. Dorn

Gillian Anderson
Gina Gershon
Glenn Close
Gloria Reuben
Goldie Hawn
Hayley Mills
Hazelle Goodman
Holland Taylor
Idina Menzel
Jane Fonda
Janelle Buchanan
Jennifer Beals
Jennifer Hudson
Jenifer Lewis
Jessica Walter
Joie Lee
Joy Behar
Joyce DeWitt
Judith Ivey
Judy Gold
Julia Murney
Julia Stiles
Julianna Margulies
Julie Halston
Julie Kavner
Karen Kuykendall
Kate Winslet
Katherine Helmond
Kathleen Chalfant
Kathy Najimy
Kellie Martin
Kim Coles
Kim Fields
Kit Williams
Kristi Lee

Lainie Kazan
Laura Kelly
Lauren Hollis
Lauren Lane
Lauren Velez
Lily Tomlin
Linda Ellerbee
Lisa Gay Hamilton
Lisa Kron
Lisa Leguillou
LisaRaye McCoy
Lois Smith
Loretta Swit
Lucy Lawless
Lynda Carter 
Lynn Whitfield
Marisa Tomei
Marla Gibbs
Marlo Thomas
Marsha Mason
Mary Alice
Mary McDonnell
Mary Testa
Megan Goble
Melanie Brown
Melanie Griffith
Melissa Etheridge
Melissa Joan Hart
Melody Thomas Scott
Mercedes Ruehl
Meryl Streep
Michele Shay
Michelle Rodriguez
Mo Gaffney
Mo'Nique
Nell Carter

Oprah Winfrey
Pam Tillis
Patricia Kalember
Peggy Lipton
Phylicia Rashad
Polly Bergen
Queen Latifah
Ramona White-Cole
Regina Taylor
Ricki Lake
Rita Moreno
Robin Givens
Roma Maffia
Rosa Blasi
Rosario Dawson
Rosie Perez
Rue McClanahan
Ruthie Henshall
Sally Kellerman
Salma Hayek
Sanaa Lathan
Sandra Oh
Sara Ramirez
Sena Quist
Shirley Knight
Sonia Manzano
Susan Sarandon
Susie Essman
Swoosie Kurtz
Teri Garr
Teri Hatcher
Tiffany Pollard
Trenyce
Toccara Jones
Tonya Pinkins
Tovah Feldshuh
Veanne Cox
Viola Davis
Wendy Raquel Robinson
Whoopi Goldberg
Winona Ryder
Yvette Wilson

Canada
Jann Arden
Thea Andrews
Melissa Auf der Maur
Jeanne Beker
Lauren Collins
Joyce DeWitt
Shirley Douglas
Jennifer Hollett
Sass Jordan
Chantal Kreviazuk
Wendy Lands
Rachel McAdams
Alanis Morissette
Ngozi Paul
Carole Pope
Gloria Reuben
Sarika Sehgal
Mia Sheard
Tara Slone
Sonja Smits
Krista Sutton
Amanda Tapping
Mary Walsh
Simon Wilcox
Cindy Williams

A production in Ottawa in 2006 included Senators Lillian Dyck and Nancy Ruth in the cast.

Performances in other countries
The Vagina Monologues has been performed in 77 countries. Some details below:

Albania
Directed by Altin Basha, The Vagina Monologues has been playing in Albania since 2002. First time performance appeared on stage at "House Of Arts" (Tirana) on February 14, 2002. 
Actresses: 
Eriona Kakeli
Olta Daku
Nigda Dako

Antigua and Barbuda

Actresses 

 Heather Doram

Argentina
Actresses
Alicia Bruzzo
Andrea Pietra
Araceli González
Betiana Blum
Catherine Fulop
Emilia Mazer
Fabiana Rey
Florencia Peña
Gabriela Toscano
Graciela Dufau
Karina Mazzocco
María Fiorentino
María Leal
Mercedes Morán
Pinky
Silvina Chediek
Susú Pecoraro
Valeria Lynch

Australia
The play has been performed in Australia on a number of occasions. Many of the productions have been done as ensemble pieces, with the monologues being performed by an individual actress. Actresses, singers and politicians who have been involved with the Australian productions include:

Danielle Antaki
Lucy Bell
Gillian Berry
Amanda Blair
Punita Boardman
Tina Bursill
Annie Byron
Zoe Carides
Terese Casu
Penny Cook
Marika Cominos
Jenny Davis
Rebekah Elmaloglou
Judi Farr
Nikki Fuda
Deborah Galanos
Vivienne Garrett
Tottie Goldsmith
Kath Gordon
Sandy Gore
Libbi Gorr
Pippa Grandison
Zara Swindells-Grose
Jaslyn Hall
Sophia Hall
Noni Hazlehurst
Cathy Henkel
Happy Ho
Fiona Horne
Verity James
Amanda Keller
Odile Le Clezio
Genevieve Lemon
Lee Lewis
May Lloyd
Polly Low
Susan Lyons
Bree Maddox
Colette Mann
Tracy Mann
Danielle Matthews
Wendy Matthews
Susan Maushart
Jill Mckay
Genevieve Mooy
Amanda Muggleton
Bojana Novakovic
Caitlin Beresford-Ord
Dina Panozzo
Patricia Petersen
Anne Phelan
Genevieve Picot
Susie Porter
Leah Purcell
Geraldine Quinn
Pamela Rabe
Denise Roberts
Jenny Seaton
Rainee Skinner
Joy Smithers
Elizabeth Spencer
Wendy Strehlow
Penelope Swales
Karen Tighe
Melissa Tkautz
Abi Tucker
Lucy Twomey
Kym Vercoe
Zenith Virago
Tasma Walton
Diana Warnock
Giz Watson
Jacki Weaver
Julia Zemiro

Belgium
’The Vagina Monologues’ was performed by Members of the European Parliament in Brussels (European Parliament, Paul-Henri-Spaak building) on 6 March 2012.

Actresses
 Franziska Brantner (Greens, Germany) 
 Isabelle Durant (Greens, Belgium) 
 Marielle Gallo (EPP, France) 
 Sirpa Pietikäinen (EPP, Finland) 
 Ana Maria Gomes (S&D, Portugal) 
 Kartika Tamara Liotard (GUE NGL, Netherlands) 
 Ulrike Lunacek (Greens, Austria) 
 Renate Weber (ALDE, Romania) 
 Cecilia Wikström (ALDE, Sweden)

Brazil
Actresses
Betina Viany
Bia Nunnes
Cissa Guimarães
Cláudia Rodrigues
Fafy Siqueira
Lúcia Veríssimo
Mara Manzan
Tânia Alves
Totia Meireles
Vera Setta (the producer in Brazil and the mother of actress Morena Baccarin)
Zezé Polessa

Chile 
Director:
Liliana Ross (1st Season), 
Katty Kowaleczko (2nd Season)

Actresses
Katty Kowaleczko
Francisca García-Huidobro
Teresita Reyes
Patricia Velasco
Liliana Ross
Grimanesa Jiménez
Liliana García
Sigrid Alegría
Patricia Guzmán

China 
The first mainland performance occurred at Sun Yat Sen University in 2003.

Premiered in March 2009. Produced by Théatre du Rêve Expérimental (薪传实验剧团).
Official website

Director and Translator: Wang Chong (王翀)

Actresses: Alice Han Lin (林寒, U.S.), Xiao Wei (肖薇, China), Huang Rong (黄容, Taiwan)

Colombia
Director:
Fanny Mikey

Actresses:
Vicky Hernández 
Fabiana Medina
Marcela Gallego
Victoria Góngora
Ana María Kamper
Marcela Carvajal
Diana Angel

Ecuador
Actresses:
Martha Ormaza
Elena Torres
Juana Guarderas

Egypt
The first production of the monologues in Egypt was staged in 2004 by students of the American University of Cairo. The day after the staging it was condemned by Suzanne Mubarak, First Lady and President of the Egyptian National Women Committee.

France
Actresses:
Anna Prucnal
Christine Boisson, Andréa Ferréol (2003)
Astrid Veillon, Sara Giraudeau, Isabelle Aubret (2005-6)

Hong Kong
The play was originally called "VV Story" (VV物語), but changed to Vagina Monologues (陰道獨白)in the re-run. It was performed in the City Hall from 4 July to 11 July 2007.

The actresses who performed in Hong Kong are:
Crystal Kwok
Koon-Lan Law
Perry Jiao
Margaret Chung
Official website

Germany
Stuttgart (Martina Wrobel):

Berlin (Adriana Altaras): Hannelore Elsner, Katja Riemann, Ulrike Folkerts, Esther Schweins, Iris Berben, Sonja Kirchberger.

Trier (Fiona Lorenz):

Hungary
Note:
It has been playing in Hungary since 2002 by two different troupes, one in the capital, Budapest in the "Thalía Theatre", and the other troupe travelling the country.

Thalía Theatre

Producer:
Szurdi András
Director:
Bozsik Yvette
Actresses:
Fullajtár Andrea, Létay Dóra, Zarnóczay Gizi, Tóth Anita, Gryllus Dorka, Udvaros Dorottya
On the road company

Director:
Moravetz Levente
Actresses:
Xantus Barbara, Dévényi Ildikó, Nyertes Zsuzsa

India

The Vagina Monologues has been playing in India since March 2003 and is produced by POOR-BOX PRODUCTIONS. It has been given an Indian twist: The original monologue "The Flood", featuring a Jewish woman has been transformed into a story about an elderly Parsi woman; and a woman who meets a man who loves to look at her Vagina is now a Maharashtrian woman in the Indian production.

The Indian production of The Vagina Monologues is produced and directed by Mahabanoo Kotwal and Kaizaad Navroze Kotwal. The play has performed in: Mumbai, Delhi, Bangalore, Calcutta, Hyderabad, Pune, Calcutta, Bhubhaneshwar, and Colombo in Sri Lanka.

The original cast is still performing the play: Mahabanoo Mody-Kotwal, Dolly Thakore, Jayati Bhatia, Sonali Sachdev, and Avantika Akerkar. Shivani Tanksale and Varshaa Agnihotri have filled in for certain performances.

A production featuring Jane Fonda and Marisa Tomei was banned in the South-Indian city of Chennai in 2004. Despite that, Ms. Fonda, Ms. Tomei and Ms. Ensler performed in the play in Mumbai and Delhi as part of a series of events titled V-DAY INDIA 2004: THE YEAR OF THE INDIAN WOMAN WARRIOR.

In March 2009, to celebrate the 200th show of The Vagina Monologues in India, Poor-Box Productions presented V-DAY INDIA 2009: WOMEN AND MEN ENDING VIOLENCE "ALL TOGETHER". That event featured several Bollywood stars including Imran Khan, Farhan Akhtar, Zoya Akhtar, Loveleen Tandan, Sandip Soparrkar, Sid Makkar, Jessy Randhawa, Smilie Suri and Nairika Kotwal-Cornett.

The Hindi language translation of The Vagina Monologues titled Kissa Yoni Ka debuted in Mumbai at the NCPA's TATA Theatre in January 2007. The cast included: Mahabanoo Mody-Kotwal, Dolly Thakore, Varshaa Agnihotri, Russika Duggal, Geetika Tyagi and Shivani Tanksale. The last two have been replaced by Dilnaz Irani since August 2008.

The play may have been translated into Hindi and performed in January 2007.

Actresses:
Dolly Thakore, Avantika Akerkar, Jayati Bhatia, Sonali Sachdev, Mahabanoo Mody-Kotwal
Mallika Sherawat performed at the 100th show on May 29, 2005, at 9 pm.]
Jane Fonda and Marisa Tomei performed with the troupe around International Women's day in 2004 and toured Mumbai and Delhi

Indonesia
The Vagina Monologues was translated into Indonesian by Gracia D. Adiningsih and was adapted by Jajang C. Noer and Nursyahbani Katjasungkana, who is also an MP in Indonesia.

The Monologue was performed for the first time in Indonesia on March 8, 2002, in Jakarta, as part of the Women's Day celebration. It was staged at the Taman Ismail Marzuki, Jakarta Cultural Center. Some performers had doubts about the performance because the theme might be considered taboo and sensitive by some people in that country.

The performance was repeated in Yogyakarta on March 31 – April 1, 2004, and at the Cultural Center of Bengkulu, Sumatra on August 19, 2004. 
Actresses
The Vagina Monologues was performed by Indonesian actresses such as Sarah Azhari, Niniek L. Karim, Devi Permatasari, Cindy Fatika, Enno Lerian, Rima Melati, Jajang C. Noer, Nursyahbani Katjasungkana, Ratna Riantiarno, Ria Irawan, Wulan Guritno, Rachel Maryam, Cornelia Agatha, etc.

Israel
The first performances were done in spring of 2001. The following year, it was performed in English at Merkaz Hamagshamim Theater in Jerusalem as well as in Hebrew in Tel Aviv. The English performance had vocal music vignettes between each new scene. (The English cast was also invited to perform there production in Riga, Latvia for the Latvian International theater festival.) The Vagina Monologues were performed in English in Jerusalem, Israel by the Hebrew Union College-Jewish Institute of Religion as a benefit for The Jerusalem Rape Crisis Center as part of V-Day events at least since 2005. It was performed in Russian in 2006.

The show has also been produced by The Stage in an English-language performance incorporating 13 monologues in February 2014, in Tel Aviv, directed by S. Asher Gelman.

Actresses:
 Bianca Ambrosio
 Devorah Barenholtz
 Yedida Bernstein Goren
 Ma'ayan Dekel 
 Shira Dickler
 Sue Field
 Shoshana Friedman
 Sharon Kirschner
 Renana Lev-Oren
 Carson Reiners
 Adaya Turkia
 Jade Wepener
 Lisa Zigel

Japan
Actresses:
Shungicu Uchida
Naoko Nozawa
Chizuru Azuma

Kenya
Actresses:
Mumbi Kaigwa brought The Vagina Monologues to Kenya where it opened on 23 March 2003 for the first time in Africa.
Lorna Irungu

Macedonia
It is performed by Bitola Theater since April 2007.
Actresses:
Ilina Corevska
Mence Bojadzieva
Julijana Stojanovska
Elena Mose

Mexico
The Vagina Monologues opened in Mexico on October 19, 2000, and in November 2009 celebrated its 5,800th performance. It has a record 110 continuous weeks of uninterrupted performances, and on October 19, 2010, holds for Mexico an unsurpassable ten-year run. It is the only theatrical event which constantly presents 12 performances a week in Mexico City, on top of the touring versions reaching almost a hundred towns in the country. Its five venues in the capital have been: Nuevo Teatro Sala Chopin; Teatro Gran Meliá; Teatro del Hotel NH; Centro Cultural San Ángel; and Nuevo Teatro del Hotel NH.  After 14 years playing in Mexico, On May 6, 2014, the Mexican Production will become the first revival of the show in New York at the Westside Theatre Downstairs (The original theatre were the first US production was shown), making it the first open run engagement totally in Spanish. The producers are OCESA Teatro and Morris Gilbert, and has been translated into Spanish by Susana Moscatel and Erick Merino.

Director:
Abby Epstein

Actresses and Performers:

Sofía Álvarez 
Lilia Aragón 
Lidia Ávila
Nuria Bages 
Rosángela Balbó 
Rocío Banquells 
Alejandra Barros 
Pilar Boliver 
Diana Bracho
Itatí Cantoral
Laura Cortés 
 
Marintia Escobedo 
Martha Figueroa
Laura Flores 
Mónica Garza
Raquel Garza
Ana Karina Guevara 
Luz María Jerez
Lupita Jones
Claudia Lizardi
Andrea Legarreta 
Diana Leln

Irma Lozano
Laura Luz 
Joanydka Mariel 
Sylvia Mariscal
Beatríz Martínez 
Irene Moreno 
Susana Moscatel
Anabel Ochoa 
Bricia Orozco
Dominika Paleta 
Ludwika Paleta

Anilú Pardo
Dalílah Polanco 
Jana Raluy 
María Rebeca
Patricia Reyes Spíndola 
Lizzy Rodríguez
Adriana Roel 
Stephanie Salas 
Irasema Terrazas 
Joana Vega Biestro
Yolanda Ventura 

Note:
Since it opened, over 80 women: actors, communicators, singers, sexologists, journalists, dancers, politicians and social and political activists have performed in the Mexican production.

Nigeria
Director:
Ifeoma Fafunwa

Actresses:
Bukky Ajayi
Iyabo Amoke
Teni Aofiyebi
Rita Dominic
Erelu Dosumu
Zara Dosumu
Ireti Doyle
Marie Ekpere
Kate Henshaw-Nuttal
Omono Imobhio
Joke Silva

Perú
Pilar Brescia
Ivonne Frayssinet
Regina Alcóver
Laura Borlini
Bettina Oneto
Elena Romero
Ana Cecilia Natteri
Gisela Valcárcel
Stephanie Orué
Denisse Dibós
Mónica Sánchez
Melania Urbina
Ana Sofía Toguchi
Attilia Boschetti
Madgyel Ugaz
Nidia Bermejo 
Ebelin Ortiz
Elva Alcandré 
Ana Cecilia Natteri 
Denise Arregui 
Milena Alva
Gisela Ponce de León

Portugal
Guida Maria:

Actresses:
Guida Maria
São José Correia
Ana Brito e Cunha

Russia
Director:

Actresses:
Vera Voronkova
Anna Galinova
Ekaterina Konisevich

South Korea

Date: March 2007
It was held on March, 2007 with volunteers from abroad and domestic. It was named as 'The Vagina Monologues 2007' (V-Day Seoul). The performance, especially, honored the women of The House of Sharing (a home for former comfort women) as Vagina Warriors by putting on a monologue, 'Say It'. And V-Day Spotlight 2007 addresses Women in Conflict Zones because was exponentially increases the crimes of violence against women and girls.
It has planned to perform again in 2008 by V-Day Seoul Team.

Language: Korean & English (Subtitle was submitted)

Actresses:

Introduction - Jyoung-Ah, Andrea, Katherine
Hair - Sun-Young
Wear and Say - Karla, Shauna, Laurie
The Flood - Meryl
The Vagina Workshop - Jin-Hyung 
Because He Liked to Look At It - Katherine
I Was 12. My Mother Slapped Me - Seh-Eun, Yukyung, Jin-Sun, Jin-Hyung
Not-So-Happy Fact - Shauna
Say It, For the Comfort Women - Andrea
My Angry Vagina - Ama

My Vagina Was My Village - Yukyung
The Little Coochi Snorcher That Could - Jyoung-Ah
Smell - Andrea, So-Maria
My Short Skirt - Juhyun
Reclaiming Cunt - Angela
A six-year-old girl was asked - Seh-Eun, Yukyung
The Woman Who Loved to Make Vaginas Happy - Laura
I Was There In the Room - Sun-Young
2007 Spotlight Monologue - Jin-Sun

Date: Sept.- Nov., 2006

Language: Korean

Director:
Ji Na YI
Actress:
Jang Yeong Nam

South Africa
The production cited here was a College Campaign production and was run by the students of the University of KwaZulu Natal, Howard College, Durban in April 2006. Funded by AK Print, Afriscan, Badge It!, Ish Ramkissoon Surveys and aided by the university's department of Drama & Performance Studies, the production focused on reaching students via 'South African-ising' the play and locating the monologues in a South African socio-cultural and political context. AS the play is located in an American context, the actresses felt that the text should be tweaked so as to show a bit more of an African vibe. For this purpose, the director was accepting of the fact that a lot of the actresses added in South African references such as events, words in isiZulu and commentary on current affairs in South Africa. Male students from the university were eager to help and they did help in terms of administration, lighting, sound, advertising as well as merchandise and ticket sales. The show was sold out for all performance nights and the proceeds went to the Advice Desk for the Abused in Durban. The university hopes to make the play an annual event.

Director:
Nikita Ramkissoon

Actresses:
Tarryn-Lee Stevenson
Maggie Brown
Illasha Ramaloo
Erin Evashevski
Lwazi Tshabalala
Zanele Thobela
Kerensa Naiker
Lauren Johnson
Nothando Mtshali
Raeesa Abdul-Karrim
Karen Peters
Lauren Metzer
Eva Jackson
Nikita Ramkissoon
Ongezwa Mbele
Samantha Govender

Taiwan
The Vagina Monologues has been performed by the Garden of Hope Foundation (GOH) in Taiwan since 2005. In the first year, the GOH worked together with Taiwan Women's Link and the Taipei Association of Women's Rights to stage a bilingual Chinese-English performance of the play.

Since 2006, the GOH has staged the monologues with its own staff performing the roles. The GOH is an NGO that offers services to women and girls who are victims of domestic violence and sexual abuse. By playing out the stage roles, the GOH employees say they are able to identify more closely with their clients.

In the 2012 show, GOH employees were joined by the Barefoot Alice theater group – a group of actresses who were victims of sexual abuse or domestic violence in the past, and who came up through one of the GOH's counseling centers. The actors performed “playback” improvised skits of stories told by members of the audience.

Past performances:
2005: Red Play House, Taipei
2006: Jingguo Theater, Sanchong
2007: Shiquan Movie Theater, Kaohsiung
2008: Tunghai University, Taichung
2009: Taitung Railway Art Village Theater & Hualien Cultural and Creative Industries Park
2010: Chung Yuan University Concert Hall, Taoyuan
2011: Preparatory Office of the Wei Wu Ying Center for the Arts, Kaohsiung
2012: Garden of Hope central office, New Taipei City

2012 Performers:

GOH employees: 
Guo Yuyin (郭育吟)
Wang Pinxuan (王品璇)
Pang Chenchen (龐珍珍)
Lin Jiayuan (林佳緣)
Kelly Li
Debra Ji
Li Miaofen (李妙芬)
Zhou Yuru(周育如)
Gao Zhenxuan (高振軒) (male experience)

Barefoot Alice theater group members: 
Yangyoung
Rao Huihui (饒蕙蕙)
Shrek
Lin Shufen (林淑芬)
Fang Manzhen (方滿珍)

Turkey
The Vagina Monologues (Vajina Monologları, in Turkish) has been performed at various venues throughout Turkey since February 2003, with the original production taking place at the Barış Manço Cultural Center in Kadıköy, Istanbul under the direction of Almula Merter, who also translated the original script. The play, which had originally raised concerns of indecency and was denied access to venues at some publicly funded theaters, was ultimately performed to great success and subsequently inspired the locally penned 2008 book "İşte Böyle Güzelim" ("This is How I Am Beautiful") - a collection of interviews and essays on the female experience and women's sexuality in Turkey influenced by the style and greater mission of The Vagina Monologues.

Director:
Almula Merter

Actresses:
Berna Öztürk
Arzu Yanardağ
Müge Oruçkaptan
Güner Özkul
Ayşe Şule Bilgiç

United Kingdom
Carol Smillie
Karen Dunbar
Sally Lindsay
Margaret John †
Nikki Sanderson
Ruth Madoc

Uruguay
Los monólogos de la vagina was performed with success in 2007 in the Metro theatre. The earnings were donated to Casa de la Mujer de la Unión, an NGO advocating for women rights and against gender violence.

Several celebrities were on stage:
Sara Perrone (television presenter)
Beatriz Massons (actress and theatre teacher)
Verónica Linardi (actress)
Beatriz Argimón (politician)
Glenda Rondán (politician)
Mónica Bottero (journalist)
Fernanda Cabrera (news anchor)
Soledad Ortega (television presenter) 
Carolina García (television presenter)
Ana Prada (singer)
Malena Muyala (tango singer)
Samantha Navarro (singer)
Natalia Trenchi (psychiatrist)
Teresa Herrera (sociologist)
Alda Novell (female soccer activist)
Fanny Puyesky (feminist writer)
Catalina Ferrand (television presenter)
Carolina Cabrera (communicator)
Paola Penino (educator)
Lizzete Uyterhoeven (teacher)

Venezuela
Director:
Héctor Manrique

Producer:
Carolina Rincón

Actresses:
Caridad Canelón
Fabiola Colmenares
Elba Escobar
Beatriz Valdés
Tania Sarabia
Gledys Ibarra
Carlota Sosa
Eva Moreno

References

Plays by Eve Ensler